The 2017–18 SEHA League season was the seventh season of the SEHA (South East Handball Association) League and fourth under the sponsorship of the Russian oil and gas company Gazprom. Ten teams from six countries (Belarus, Croatia, Macedonia, Serbia, Slovakia and Slovenia)  participated in this year's competition.

Vardar are the defending champions. The SEHA League consists of two phases – the first one has 18 rounds in which all teams play one home and one away games against each other. Afterwards, the four best ranked clubs played on the Final Four tournament.

The campaign began on 30 August 2017 with three matches from the first round. The regular season ended on 17 March 2018.

The final four tournament was held at the Jane Sandanski Arena in Skopje, Macedonia from 13th to 15 April 2018.

Team information

Venues and locations

Personnel and kits
Following is the list of clubs competing in 2017–18 SEHA League, with their manager, team captain, kit manufacturer and shirt sponsor.

Coaching changes

Regular season

Standings

Results

Final Four 

The SEHA - Gazprom League Executive Committee has made the decision for the final four tournament to be held at the Jane Sandanski Arena in Skopje, Macedonia from 13th to 15 April.

Format
The first-placed team of the standings faced the fourth-placed team, and the second-placed team played against the third-placed team from the standings in the Final Four.

Semifinals

Match for third place

Final

Top goalscorers

References

External links 
 Official website

SEHA League
2017–18 domestic handball leagues